Derek Brown (born September 21, 1974) is an American entrepreneur, writer, and bartender. He owns the bars Columbia Room, The Passenger, Mockingbird Hill, Eat the Rich, and Southern Efficiency in Washington, D.C. Brown serves on the board of directors for the Museum of the American Cocktail and is the Chief Spirits Advisor for the National Archives Foundation. Brown also teaches seminars on the importance of alcohol in shaping society.

Early life 
Brown was born in Washington D.C. and grew up in Olney, Maryland. He lived briefly in Charleston, South Carolina and Atlanta, Georgia before returning to the D.C. area to attend George Mason University. Throughout high school (at Sherwood High School) he was a part of the Washington, D.C. punk scene.

Career

Beginnings
Brown began bartending in 2000 at Adams Morgan bar Rocky's before moving on to Chef Frank Ruta's Palena and becoming interested in wine. He started working at Michel Richard's Citronelle under the tutelage of sommelier Mark Slater and then moved on to work alongside Chef Johnny Monis as the sommelier at restaurant Komi and was included in Wine & Spirits magazine's 2007 Top 5 New Sommeliers in America. While at Komi, Brown was a founder of the underground cocktail club Hummingbird to Mars that operated out of Bourbon in Adams Morgan.

He returned to the bar full-time in 2008. He worked alongside owners Ian and Eric Hilton to open speakeasy The Gibson on the 14th Street Corridor in Washington D.C. which served classic cocktails.

The Passenger and Columbia Room

In 2009, restaurateur Paul Ruppert approached Brown about opening a bar in a space adjacent to the Warehouse Theatre. Brown brought his brother Tom Brown on board, a bartender at wine bar Cork at the time, and they decided to turn the space into two projects. The first was The Passenger, which opened in November 2009. Designed to be a wine bar where customers could sip burgundy while listening to the band Fugazi, it opened with a wine list but no cocktail list. The brothers decided that if someone wanted to order a cocktail, it would be much easier to talk through their preferences than have the guest read a list of ingredients that gave an inaccurate indication of what the cocktail would taste like. Soon the wine list disappeared and The Passenger became a full swing cocktail bar, without a cocktail menu (though in later years, the bar did maintain a list of daily specials). The Passenger is named after the Iggy Pop song of the same name.

In March 2010 they opened the Brown's Columbia Room, a 10-seat cocktail location in the back of The Passenger. Also without a cocktail menu, Columbia Room focuses on a tasting menu that combines seasonal ingredients, classic cocktails, and attention to craftsmanship.

Recognition 
 2010 Bon Appetit Top 10 New Cocktail Bars in the U.S.: Columbia Room
 2010 GQ 25 Best Cocktail Bars in America: Columbia Room 
 2011 US Airways Magazine 14 Most Trend-Setting Restaurants in the US: The Passenger and Columbia Room
 2011 Garden & Gun Best New Bars: Columbia Room 
 2011 Travel + Leisure America's Best Cocktail Bars: Columbia Room
 2012 Food & Wine 50 Best Bars in America: The Passenger and Columbia Room
 2012 USA Today 10 Great Classic American Cocktail Bars: The Passenger and Columbia Room
 2012 James Beard Foundation Semi-finalist for Outstanding Bar Program: Columbia Room
 2012 Washington Post Dining Guide Critic's Rating 3 Stars: Columbia Room
 2012 Tales of the Cocktail Spirited Awards Top 4 Nominees - Best American Cocktail Bar: Columbia Room
 2012 Travel & Leisure America's Best Cocktail Bars: Columbia Room
 2013 Esquire 25 Best Bars in America: Columbia Room
 2013 Washington's 18 Most Iconic Drinks: Columbia Room's Dry Martini
 2014 James Beard Foundation Semi-finalist for Outstanding Bar Program: Columbia Room
 2016 Departures Magazine Best New Cocktail Bars in America
 2017 James Beard Foundation Semi-finalist for Outstanding Bar Program: Columbia Room
 2017 Spirited Awards: Best American Cocktail Bar

Closing and Re-Opening
On January 1, 2015, The Passenger and Columbia Room closed. The building at 1021 7th St NW was sold to make way for an office and retail development by Douglas Development Corp. The Columbia Room re-opened in Blagden Alley in February of 2016 under Derek Brown's direction. The Passenger re-opened north of its old location on 7th Street in the fall of 2016 under the sole ownership of Tom Brown.

Drink Company
Formerly known as Laughing Cocktail, Drink Company is owned by Derek Brown and Angie Fetherston. They formed their partnership in April 2010 and have since worked together on many projects, including a trio of bars named Mockingbird Hill, Eat the Rich, and Southern Efficiency - known as the DB3 - in the Shaw neighborhood. They also led the efforts in working with D.C. City Council to pass a proclamation naming the Rickey the official cocktail of Washington, D.C. with the author of Prohibition in Washington D.C. Garrett Peck.

Mockingbird Hill, Eat the Rich, and Southern Efficiency was named among Bon Appétit magazine's 2014 "50 Best New Restaurants in America".  After a period of time where the three bars were turned into a seasonal, pop-up model, the location closed.

Mockingbird Hill

Mockingbird Hill, which opened on June 5, 2013, was a bar that focuses on sherry (a fortified wine from the south of Spain) and is influenced by bars in Madrid. The name of the bar comes from The Clash song Spanish Bombs which gives homage to those who fought together against the fascist regime in the Spanish Civil War. Sherry, a long-time love of Derek's, is a complement to food, especially cured ham.

 2013 Garden & Gun 10 Best New Bars: Mockingbird Hill
 2013 Zagat Hottest new bars in D.C.: Mockingbird Hill
 2013 Washington Post: 2 stars for Mockingbird Hill
 Washington Post: 13 Best Local Dishes of 2013: Trout Salad at Mockingbird Hill
 2014 Tales of the Cocktail Spirited Awards Best New Bar semifinalist: Mockingbird Hill
 2014 New York Times: 6 Innovative Ice Coffees: Mockingbird Hill
 2014 Southern Living 100 Best Bars in the South: Mockingbird Hill

Eat the Rich

Eat the Rich, which opened on October 18, 2013, was an oyster bar created by Derek Brown, Angie Fetherston, and award-winning oysterman Travis Croxton of Rappahannock River Oysters. Featuring local oysters and a Chesapeake Bay-centric menu, Eat the Rich is a tribute to the oyster houses of Washington, D.C., and Mid-Atlantic cuisine. They serve pitcher cocktails and oyster shooters alongside a playlist of Derek and Travis' favorite musical genres: punk, rock, and heavy metal. The bar was named after a Motörhead song. 

 Eat the Rich received a 2.5-star rating by Washington Post restaurant critic Tom Sietsema.
 2014 Best of D.C. Brunch Dish: Eat the Rich's Chesapeake Boil

Southern Efficiency

Southern Efficiency, which opened on December 21, 2013, was a Southern food and whiskey bar specializing in the breadth of Southern whiskey and off-the-beaten-path Southern recipes. The spirits menu is curated by bar manager JP Fetherston, Derek Brown's protégé, with a small but eclectic group of whiskies including traditional Bourbons and whiskey from craft distillers. JP, former head of research and development at Columbia Room, has also created a whiskey-focused cocktail menu that includes classic cocktails and cocktails in jars and on tap, such as his own Smoked Cola & White Whiskey.

 2014 Food & Wine The People's Best New Bar (Northeast): Southern Efficiency
 2014 Zagat 10 hottest bars in D.C.: Southern Efficiency
 2014 Eater D.C. Best Bartender: JP Fetherston of Southern Efficiency
 Washington Post: 40 Dishes Washingtonians must try in 2014: Southern Efficiency's Peanut Soup

Writing
Brown had a regular web column for The Atlantic from 2009 to 2011. He is now a freelance writer with articles published in The Washington Post, The Huffington Post, Entrepreneur Magazine, Punch Magazine, Table Matters, and Bon Appétit Magazine.

In 2019, Brown (with Robert Yule) published Spirits Sugar Water Bitters, an outgrowth of his work as Chief Spirits Advisor to the National Archives Foundation.

In 2022, Brown published Mindful Mixology: A Comprehensive Guide to No- and Low-Alcohol Cocktails with 60 Recipes, an outgrowth of his work advocating for mindful drinking by both workers and patrons in bars.

Professional accolades
Derek Brown has shared drinks with many notable people, including Martha Stewart, Woody Harrelson, and Barack and Michelle Obama. He travels the world in search of great drinks, spirits, and their history.

Some of his professional accolades include:
 2007 Wine & Spirits Top Five Sommeliers in the U.S.
 2010 Washingtonian 40 Who Shaped 2010 
 2010 James Beard Foundation Awards Semi-finalist (Wine & Spirits Professional)
 2010 The Wall Street Journal "A Master of Mixological Science" Feature 
 2014 StarChefs Rising Star Restaurateur of the Year
 2015 Imbibe Magazine's Bartender of the Year
 2015 James Beard Foundation Awards Semi-finalist (Wine & Spirits Professional)

Personal life
Derek Brown lives in Washington, D.C. with his son.

Interests and advocacy
Brown is involved with Share Our Strength and has served as mixology chair for their Taste of the Nation fundraising event where his bars participate every year to raise money and awareness with the goal of ending childhood hunger in America. He's also an Ambassador of Washington, D.C. for Destination D.C., an organization that supports tourism and travel to D.C.  He also has increasingly become an advocate for responsible, mindful drinking and non-alcoholic cocktail recipes.

References

1974 births
People from Washington, D.C.
Living people
American bartenders